The Frost Tower is a 23-story skyscraper in San Antonio, Texas, USA. It opened in 2019 at a cost of $142 million and is the first new office tower built in downtown San Antonio since 1989 when Weston Centre was built. Frost Tower replaced the old Frost Bank Tower as the headquarters of the eponymously named Frost Bank when it opened in 2019.

Reception
The building won the 2019 Best Office/Retail/Mixed-Use Project by Engineering News-Record (ENR Texas & Louisiana) and has been compared to Queen Elsa's ice palace, a drill bit, and a can opener.

See also
List of tallest buildings in San Antonio

References

Skyscraper office buildings in San Antonio
Office buildings completed in 2019
2019 establishments in Texas